The Sleepover is a 2020 American action comedy film directed by Trish Sie, from a screenplay by Sarah Rothschild. It stars Sadie Stanley, Maxwell Simkins, Ken Marino, Cree Cicchino, Lucas Jaye, Karla Souza, Enuka Okuma, Erik Griffin, Joe Manganiello, and Malin Åkerman. It tells the story about a girl and her friends having a sleepover when they learn that her mother is a former thief under witness protection that gets roped back into that life when her old group successfully locates her. The film was released on August 21, 2020 by Netflix.

Plot
In Boston, Clancy Finch is invited by her crush Travis Schultz to a party at his house. Her brother Kevin is caught dancing in the restroom by some older students who record him and bully him, but Clancy's and Kevin's mother Margot, the lunch monitor, scares them away. The bullies upload a remix video of Kevin dancing and Margot admonishing them to YouTube, where it quickly goes viral, gaining over two million views.

Kevin, Clancy, and her friend Mim are picked up by their father Ron, an awkward pastry chef. Clancy asks her parents if she can go to Travis's party and they both say no, leading to her insulting her mother and getting grounded. Later, Kevin's friend Lewis comes over for a sleepover in a tent in the backyard.

That night, Clancy and Mim sneak out. On their way to the party, they first scare the boys, causing Lewis to run into the house to pee. While in the bathroom, he notices a man and a woman break into the house, force Ron at gun point and Margot (whom they call "Matilda") to come with them under threat of Ron's death to get their group back together. Margot agrees, removing her necklace as a clueless Ron is brought along. Lewis runs back to the tent and tells the others what happened.

Not believing him, the four run back inside until they notice United States Marshals Agent Henry Gibbs sneaking into the house. An intruder, they attack him, tying him to a chair. He tells them Margot was in the Witness Protection Program because she turned in the boss of the crime syndicate she was in, but has been located due to the viral video.

In another location, Elise and her associate are briefed on the mission. Also present is Margot's criminal ex-fiancé Leo Bouchot, who had been in the Witness Protection Program before he was found.

The kids follow clues Margot left them in the flour and her necklace when she was taken away, leading them to a storage unit, a secret spy center. They take a self-driving spy car to Travis's party. Travis agrees to take them to Downtown Boston in his family's boat, but they are stopped by the U.S. Coast Guard and he has a revoked license.

The four jump off and swim away, then reach the building where they believe their parents are located. They instead find a secret passageway behind a painting of Margot's favorite poet W. B. Yeats leading them to the hideout of Margot's best friend Jay, who tracks Margot's GPS chip to an extravagant gala. Jay tells the kids to stay, but Clancy handcuffs her to a pipe so they can all leave.

At the gala, Ron, Margot, and Leo are attempting to steal Queen of Moldana's crown by poisoning her. Upon meeting her, Ron accidentally ingests the poison and vomits everywhere, gala security then detains them. When they are about to be sent to the FBI, Margot and Leo knock out all the security guards. They go with Ron to the main floor, where they find the four kids, who got in by pretending to be live musicians. The seven escape to Leo's safe house.

There, they discover Leo was never in the Witness Protection Program, but is actually the new head of the syndicate. Elise holds them at gunpoint and calls the police to frame them for the theft. Ron throws a wolf spider at her to make her drop her gun and then shoots the chandelier at her. Margot hot-wires a car that Ron uses to drive Leo into a bunch of construction barrels, then Margot kicks the crown out of his hands and Clancy catches it.

The Boston Police arrest Leo and those involved. Henry drives everyone back to the Finch house where Travis returns Clancy's jacket and Lewis's mother picks him up. Everyone returns to their normal lives.

Cast
 Sadie Stanley as Clancy, a young girl who is the daughter of Ron and Margot
 Maxwell Simkins as Kevin, the brother of Clancy
 Ken Marino as Ron, an awkward pastry chef who is the father of Clancy and Kevin
 Cree Cicchino as Mim, a social media-obsessed friend of Clancy and Kevin
 Lucas Jaye as Lewis, an uptight friend of Kevin
 Karla Souza as Jay, the best friend of Margot
 Enuka Okuma as Elise / Dark Figure, a criminal that knows Matilda
 Erik Griffin as Henry Gibbs, a United States Marshals Agent

 Joe Manganiello as Leo, Matilda's ex-fiancé who becomes the new leader of the crime syndicate that Matilda was a part of

 Malin Åkerman as Margot, a former thief for a crime syndicate who is in the witness protection program operating as a lunch monitor

 Harry Aspinwall as Baxter / Pizza Guy, who delivers pizzas
 Matthew Grimaldi as Travis Schultz, Clancy's love interest
 Marissa Carpio as Mrs. Patoc
 Savanna Winter as Emma / Mean Girl
 Daniel Washington as Head of Security
 Jasbir Mann as King of Moldana
 Enku Gubaie as Queen of Moldana

Production
In August 2019, it was announced Malin Åkerman, Ken Marino, Joe Manganiello, Erik Griffin, Karla Souza, Enuka Okuma, Sadie Stanley, Maxwell Simkins, Cree Cicchino and Lucas Jaye had joined the cast of the film, with Trish Sie directing from a screenplay by Sarah Rothschild. LD Entertainment will produce the film, while Netflix will distribute.

Filming
Principal photography began in August 2019.

Release
It was released on August 21, 2020 on Netflix.

Reception

Metacritic assigned the film a weighted average score of 46 out of 100, based on nine critics, indicating "mixed or average reviews".

References

External links
 
 

2020 films
2020 action comedy films
American action comedy films
Films scored by Germaine Franco
LD Entertainment films
English-language Netflix original films
United States Marshals Service in fiction
Films shot in Massachusetts
Films set in Massachusetts
Films directed by Trish Sie
2020s English-language films
2020s American films